Possum Walk may refer to:
Possum Walk Hotel, a historic building in Nodaway County, Missouri
Possum Walk, Missouri, an unincorporated community in Nodaway County, Missouri
Possum Walk, Texas, a former town in Trinity County, Texas

See also
Possum Walk Creek (disambiguation)